Chaturbhuj Nagar was born in 1935 in Antana village in Atru Tahasil district, Baran, Rajasthan. He was an Indian politician who is a leader of the Bharatiya Janata Party from Rajasthan. He was a member of 6th and 7th Lok Sabha elected from Jhalawar.

References

1935 births
Living people
People from Jhalawar district
Lok Sabha members from Rajasthan
India MPs 1977–1979
India MPs 1980–1984
Indians imprisoned during the Emergency (India)
Bharatiya Janata Party politicians from Rajasthan